Black River Coliseum is a 5,000-seat multi-purpose arena in Poplar Bluff, Missouri. It was built in 1999.  It hosts various local concerts and sporting events for the area.

In March 2008, it was briefly used to house hundreds of area residents who had to be evacuated due to historic flood levels in the region in the same fashion as New Orleans refugees from Hurricane Katrina sought shelter in the Louisiana Superdome and Astrodome.

References

External links
Black River Coliseum Official Website

Sports venues in Missouri
Buildings and structures in Butler County, Missouri
1999 establishments in Missouri
Sports venues completed in 1999